Si Prachan is a district (amphoe) in the eastern part of Suphan Buri province, central Thailand. Si Prachan is well known for being the location of the Thai Buffalo Conservation Village, buffalo conservation centre.

History
The government separated some parts of Tha Phi Liang District (now Mueang Suphan Buri) and Sam Chuk district to create Si Prachan District in 1901.

Si Prachan, formerly known as "Kraphung" (กระพุ้ง). It was renamed in 1937 in honour of Khun Si Prachanraksa (Sam Mithongkham), the first Si Prachan subdistrict headman.

Geography
Neighbouring districts are (from the south clockwise): Mueang Suphan Buri, Don Chedi and Sam Chuk; and Sawaeng Ha, Pho Thong, Samko and Wiset Chai Chan of Ang Thong province.

The main water resource of the district is the Tha Chin River.

Administration

Central administration 
Si Prachan is divided into nine subdistricts (tambons), which are further subdivided into 64 administrative villages (mubans).

Local administration 
There are six subdistrict municipalities (thesaban tambons) in the district:
 Ban Krang consisting of parts of subdistrict Ban Krang.
 Wang Wa consisting of subdistrict Wang Wa.
 Wang Nam Sap consisting of subdistrict Wang Nam Sap.
 Si Prachan consisting of parts of subdistricts Si Prachan, Ban Krang.
 Wang Yang consisting of subdistrict Wang Yang.
 Plai Na consisting of subdistrict Plai Na.

There are four subdistrict administrative organizations (SAO) in the district:
 Si Prachan consisting of parts of subdistrict Si Prachan.
 Mot Daeng consisting of subdistrict Mot Daeng.
 Bang Ngam consisting of subdistrict Bang Ngam.
 Don Pru consisting of subdistrict Don Pru.

References

Si Prachan